Robert Bowne Minturn (November 16, 1805 – January 9, 1866) was one of the most prominent American merchants and shippers of the mid-19th century.  Today, he is probably best known as being one of the owners of the famous clipper ship, Flying Cloud.

Family

Minturn was born to a family long prominent in New England and New York shipping circles.  His father was William Minturn (Jr.) (1776–1818); his mother was Sarah Bowne, a descendant of John Bowne.  William was "a well-known merchant shipper" and was one of the founders of the Mutual Fire Insurance Company of New York. He is reported to have spent several years in the China trade, where there were enormous profits to be made.  He was at various times in partnership with his brother Jonas and in the firm of Minturn and Champlin.  After the failure of Minturn & Champlin, he took ill and died soon after, when Robert was in his early teens.

It appears that Robert Minturn's grandfather, William Minturn (Sr.) (born Rhode Island, March 18, 1738; died Newport, Rhode Island, August 23, 1799), was one of the residents of Rhode Island who feared that the British would attempt to re-take their lost colonies after the American Revolution and moved his family and business to New York, believing it would be more protected from seaborne attack.  He was one of the founders of Hudson, New York.  In 1791 William again moved, this time to New York City, where the opportunities were greater (and shipping distances shorter).  Soon he became wealthy: he, his son, grandson, and great grandson all garnered listings in the Encyclopedia of American Wealth.  In 1799, his health failing, William Minturn returned to Rhode Island to retire but he died within the month.  His widow (Penelope Greene, born August 21, 1746; died April 6, 1821, the daughter of Benjamin Greene and Niobe Paul and a third cousin once removed of General Nathanael Greene) returned to New York where she lived among her sons on Pearl Street.

Robert B. Minturn married Anna Mary Wendell (born ca. 1811) in June 1835.  She was the daughter of John Lansing Wendell, a prominent attorney in Albany, New York, and reported to have been involved with Grinnell, Minturn & Co. though Robert joined the firm before his marriage. Anna died in 1886 and left an estate worth about $1 million, today (2020) worth about $1.74 billion in relative output. 
Robert's sister Sarah married Henry Grinnell, who later became Robert's business partner.

Career
Robert Minturn received an English education, but he was forced by the death of his father to leave school; at the age of fourteen, he began work in a counting-house. He was received into partnership in 1825 with Charles Green, whose clerk he had been.  In 1830, he entered the firm of Fish and Grinnell; his sister Sarah had married partner Henry Grinnell in 1822.  In 1832, the firm was reorganized as Grinnell, Minturn & Co., or simply Grinnell & Minturn.  That company was already established in the transatlantic packet trade, but it grew tremendously as an Gorta Mór led many to emigrate to North America, from 1845 through 1855. When the California gold rush caused a large increase in traffic to that state, Grinnell & Minturn established a shipping line to serve the market, and bought the Flying Cloud for that line; Robert Minturn actually owned a portion of the ship in his personal capacity.  The success of Grinnell & Minturn made Robert Minturn a wealthy man, and his son Robert, Jr., joined the firm as well.

Other activities
In May 1848, an overworked Robert Minturn and his wife, sister-in-law, and six children (with servants) took an extended "grand tour" of Europe and parts of the Middle East, according to a hagiography-"memoir" published by his eldest son. He was inspired by both the beauty of the cities and the charitable efforts of their citizens in this regard.

They sailed on one of his many packet ships, the Patrick Henry, Captain Joseph C. Delano, first cousin to Franklin Delano Roosevelt's maternal grandfather Warren Delano Jr., the American merchant who made a large fortune smuggling illegal opium into China.

"[The Patrick Henry] was one of the vessels which had so often before carried invalids, or tired clergymen, or young men broken down by study, sent by Mr. Minturn to recruit their strength by a voyage," Robert B. Minturn, Jr. wrote. "He had so frequently done these kindnesses, that the application for them at last became incessant. Sometimes it was for an individual, sometimes for a family of foreigners, who had come to America in search of what they did not find — a living — and were most thankful to be sent back to their homes across the Atlantic." The Minturns took an eighteen-month tour of England, France, Italy, Switzerland, Germany, Jerusalem and Egypt that was said to have inspired plans that led to the creation of New York's Central Park.

In England, Minturn met the poet William Wordsworth and Lord Palmerston, who is remembered, among other endeavors, for evicting 2,000 tenants on his County Sligo estate and financing the cheapest passages possible on coffin ships to Canada on which many died or became sick and died later. Minturn went also to Scotland, from where he took the shortest route to Portrush in Northern Ireland, the country whose refugees of an Gorta Mór had made him, in today's currency, a billionaire. He visited the Giant's Causeway, which "excited his imagination," and promptly went on to France.

Robert Minturn declined all offers of public office, except the post of the first Commissioner of Emigration, which he accepted, in the newly legislated body in 1847, from "a wish to secure the rights of emigrants."  It seems unsurprising that his business prospered from the transportation of many immigrants to the United States.  He was an active manager of charitable associations in New York City and was a founder of St. Luke's Hospital. He was the first president of the Union League Club, which was formed when the Union Club membership was divided over support for President Lincoln and the Civil War.

Minturn and his wife donated land for the establishment of New York's Central Park, having been inspired by the beauty of foreign cities and their parks, as seen during his family's trip abroad in 1848–1849. Minturn served as a vice president on the relief committee that eventually sent the Macedonian, June 19, 1847, with supplies to Ireland. He was said to hand out food to the city's growing urban poor, from the front stoop of his New York townhouse before helping found the Association for Improving the Condition of the Poor. Minturn reportedly once noted that the $5 million spent on ship fares in 1847, "substantially reduced the cost of carrying freight," and helped the economy by lowering the price of American cotton and grain for English buyers. According to the website, An Irish Passenger, An American Family, And Their Time, profit, "rather than humanitarian impulses" drove immigration, "and because government regulatory agencies and private philanthropies were unwilling or unable to exert much control over that business, 19th century emigrants were often literally treated as human freight."

In 1844, Minturn offered Irish Catholic priest and teetotalist reformer Father Mathew free passage in any of their ships to come visit America, which he accepted in 1849, aboard the Ashburton (1842, 1,015 tons), beginning a two-year visit during which he acquired 600,000 followers who took his temperance pledge to treat alcohol abuse, alcohol dependence and alcoholism. Father Mathew befriended Frederick Douglass when Douglass visited Ireland in 1845. The priest wanted to remain singularly focused on helping people stop drinking alcohol and was criticized for not speaking out against slavery and foregoing the abolitionist cause, a complicated issue for the immigrant Irish Catholics who, some historians suggest, were competing with Blacks for jobs in the U.S. at the time.

In 1848, Minturn provided evidence before Parliament that teetotalism was encouraged by American shipowners as underwriters offered "a return of 10% off the premium on voyages performed without the consumption of spirits."

Like his Quaker forebears, he was an abolitionist reported to have purchased a number of slaves for the purpose of setting them free. He was a benefactor of the Freedmen's Association and a co-founder (with 23 others) of Children's Village.

He bought a 173-acre estate in Hastings, New York in 1857, "Locust Wood," in what is now Zinsser Park. The home was torn down in 1967.

Robert Minturn died suddenly at age 60 in 1866. Fifteen years later (1881), his second-born son, John Wendell Minturn, who joined the firm at age 24 and was a principal owner of Grinnell, Minturn & Co with his older brother, died of suicide at 78 South Street, the company's headquarters. John was 42 years old. Donated lands of the family estate in Hastings, New York, were instrumental in the development of an 184-acre retreat, children's home and school in the 1890s that no longer exists. Robert Bowne Minturn's granddaughters were immortalized in an 1899 miniature oil painting held by the New-York Historical Society.

Descendants
Robert Bowne Minturn, Jr. (born New York, February 21, 1836); graduated from Columbia in 1856 and joined the family firm soon thereafter. He married Sarah Susannah Shaw (1839–1926), sister of Colonel Robert Gould Shaw; he was the author of New York to Delhi (New York, 1858). Minturn, Colorado, is named for him.
Susan Carter Minturn (born New York, ca. 1837); she married Thomas Baring in 1859.
John Wendell Minturn (born New York, ca. 1838).
Anna Mary Minturn (born New York, March 16, 1841); she married Rev. Charles Penrose Quicke.
Edith Minturn (born New York, March 27, 1844), who married Mahlon Day Sands
Sarah Minturn (born New York, ca. 1845).
Eliza Theodora Minturn (born New York, October 15, 1850).
William Minturn (born New York ca. 1854).
Another descendant is Edie Sedgwick, his great-great-granddaughter.

Bibliography
Kelley, Rev. Edmond, A Family Redeemed From Bondage; Being Rev. Edmond Kelley, (the Author,) His Wife, and Four Children.  New Bedford, Massachusetts (published by the author), 1851. (http://docsouth.unc.edu/neh/kelley/kelley.html)
Lawson, Melinda, "A Profound National Devotion": The Civil War Union Leagues and the Construction of a New National Patriotism; Civil War History Volume 48, Number 4, December 2002, pp. 338–362.
The Bowne House Historical Society, Inc., History: Bowne Family Biographies, 2006.

References

External links
 

1805 births
1866 deaths
19th-century American businesspeople
Winthrop family